In Oklahoma, Tech Prep is an administered through the Oklahoma Department of Career and Technology Education, located in Stillwater, Oklahoma. Tech Prep is funded through Section II of the Carl D. Perkins Career and Technical Education Act of 2006.

Tech Prep Background
Tech Prep, which began in the early 1980s as a small, locally driven high school improvement strategy, has grown into a major national strategy for improving students' academic knowledge and technical skills. As defined in the Carl D. Perkins Vocational and Technical Education Act (Perkins), Tech Prep is a sequenced program of study that combines at least two years of secondary and two years of postsecondary education. It is designed to help students gain academic knowledge and technical skills, and often earn college credit for their secondary coursework. Programs are intended to lead to an associate degree or a certificate in a specific career field, and ultimately, to high wage, high skill employment or advanced postsecondary training.

Roughly 47% of the nation's high schools (or 7,400 high schools) offer one or more Tech Prep programs. Nearly every community and technical college in the nation participates in a Tech Prep consortium, as do many four-year colleges and universities, private businesses, and employer and union organizations.

Research on the effectiveness of Tech Prep programs is inconclusive. State evaluations in Texas and New York found some evidence that Tech Prep improved students' grade point averages, lowered dropout, reduced absences, increased high school completion, and improved postsecondary enrollment. However, these evaluations did not find evidence that Tech Prep improved students' scores on standardized academic achievement tests, and findings were mixed on whether Tech Prep improved students' postsecondary achievement or labor market outcomes. The last national evaluation of Tech Prep programs, conducted in 1997, found that Tech Prep programs were not always implemented as envisioned in the legislation, perhaps lessening their impact on student outcomes.

These programs support students' transitions to postsecondary education through dual enrollment, access to advanced facilities and labs, and exposure to college life.

Tech Prep Consortia
In Oklahoma, Tech Prep is administered through the OK Department of CareerTech and carried out through local technology centers. The students attend a local CareerTech center which provides career and technology education for high school students in the U.S. state of Oklahoma. The students generally spend part of each day in their respective schools pursuing academic subjects in addition to attending classes in their affiliated technology center. Technology centers are part of the CareerTech System overseen by the OK Department of CareerTech in Stillwater, Oklahoma.

Central Oklahoma Tech Prep - Gordon Cooper Technology Center, Wes Watkins Technology Center, Green Country Technology Center
Chisholm Trail Technology Center Consortium - Chisholm Trail Technology Center
CREATE - Oklahoma City Community College
Eastern Oklahoma County Consortium - Eastern Oklahoma County Technology Center
EDUCATE - Caddo-Kiowa Technology Center
FOCUS - Moore Norman Technology Center
High Plains Tech Prep Consortium - High Plains Technology Center
Kiamichi Technology Centers Tech Prep Consortium - Kiamichi Technology Center
Link Tech Prep Consortium - Mid-America Technology Center
Meridian Tech Prep Consortium - Meridian Technology Center
Mid-Del Career Connection - Mid-Del Technology Center	
Northeast Tech Prep Consortium- Northeast Technology Center
Northwest Oklahoma Tech Prep - Northwest Technology Center
Pioneer Technology Center Tech Prep - Pioneer Technology Center
Pontotoc Tech Prep Consortium- Pontotoc Technology Center
Red River Tech Prep - Red River Technology Center	
Redlands Community College Tech Prep Consortium - Redlands Community College
SOAR Tech Prep - Metro Technology Center
Southern OK Tech Prep Consortium - Southern Oklahoma Technology Center
Southwest OK Tech Prep Consortium - Great Plains Technology Center
Southwest Tech Prep - Southwest Technology Center
Three Rivers Tech Prep Partners - Indian Capital Technology Center
Tri County Technology Center Tech Prep - Tri County Technology Center
Tulsa Tech Prep - Tulsa Technology Center
Western Tech Prep Consortium- Western Technology Center
World Class Graduates - Central Technology Center

Alliance
To fulfil the articulation agreement of the Perkins Legislation Oklahoma uses the Cooperative Alliance Project. In Alliances, colleges and technology centers voluntarily seek approval of all existing cooperative agreements from their respective state agencies.  While each technology center establishes a primary partnership with one college, other existing agreements from "secondary" college partners are also honored in the alliance process.  Through these alliances, all students (high school and adult) in cooperative CTE programs who meet technical admission requirements are eligible to receive dual college credit as they complete their program's courses. The Cooperative Alliance is a partnership of the Oklahoma Department of Career and Technology Education and the Oklahoma Regents for Higher Education.

Alliance Partners
Bacone College
Cameron University
Carl Albert State College
Coffeyville Community College
Conners State College
Cowley County Community College
Eastern Oklahoma State College
Murray State College
Northeastern Oklahoma College
Northern Oklahoma College
Oklahoma City Community College
Oklahoma Panhandle State University
Oklahoma Wesleyan College
Oklahoma State University-Okmulgee
Oklahoma State University-Oklahoma City
Redlands Community College
Rochester Institute of Technology
Rogers State University
Rose State College
Seminole State College
St. Gregory's University
Tulsa Community College
Western Oklahoma State College

See also
List of school districts in Oklahoma
List of private schools in Oklahoma
List of colleges and universities in Oklahoma

External links
Oklahoma Tech Prep homepage
Oklahoma Cooperative Alliance Project
OK Tech Prep Blog
OK Tech Prep Association
Oklahoma Department of Career and Technology Education
Oklahoma State Regents for Higher Education

Vocational education in Oklahoma
OK Cooperative Alliance